was a town located in Higashiyatsushiro District, Yamanashi Prefecture, Japan. As of 2003, the town had an estimated population of 11,111 and a density of 362.87 persons per km². The total area was 30.62 km². Ichinomiya literally means "the first shrine" of the province. In case of this town, it is the Sengen Shrine of the Kai Province.

History 
On October 12, 2004, Ichinomiya, along with the towns of Isawa, Misaka and Yatsushiro, the village of Sakaigawa (all from Higashiyatsushiro District), and the town of Kasugai (from Higashiyamanashi District), was merged to create the city of Fuefuki.

Transportation
 Route 20 to Tokyo or Shiojiri
 Route 411 to Ōme via Okutama
 Ichinomiya-Misaka IC, Chūō Highway

Special Products
 Peaches

External links
 Official website of Fuefuki in Japanese (English portions)

Dissolved municipalities of Yamanashi Prefecture
Fuefuki, Yamanashi